The Pebbles of Étretat (also known as Cobblestones) is a 1972 French-Italian romance-drama film written and directed by Sergio Gobbi. Étretat is a coastal commune in the Seine-Maritime department in Normandie region in north-western France.

Cast 

 Virna Lisi  as  Alny
 Maurice Ronet  as  Kelvo
 Annie Cordy  as  Brigitte
 Juliet Mills  as  Florence
 Grégoire Aslan  as  Timakoff
 Christian Barbier  as  Jean-Pierre
  Philippe Baronnet as François
 Michel Robbe  as  Régis
  Amarande as  Mme Grance

References

External links

1972 films
1972 romantic drama films
French romantic drama films
Italian romantic drama films
Films directed by Sergio Gobbi
1970s French-language films
1970s French films
1970s Italian films